Kennekuk Cove County Park is a  park in Blount Township in Vermilion County, Illinois, United States. It includes a  lake called Lake Mingo.

There are two cemeteries within the park:  Dodson Cemetery and the Lorrence Pioneer Cemetery.

External links
Park website 
Vermilion County Conservation District main page

County parks in the United States
Protected areas of Vermilion County, Illinois
1974 establishments in Illinois
Parks in Illinois
Protected areas established in 1974